Mavronisi ("black island") is a small islet off the southern coast of the Greek island of Crete and in the Libyan Sea. The islet is administered from Moires in Heraklion regional unit.

Landforms of Heraklion (regional unit)
Uninhabited islands of Crete
Islands of Greece